The Colleen Bawn Solar Power Station is a  solar power plant under development in Zimbabwe. The project is owned by Pretoria Portland Cement Limited, who own a cement factory in Colleen Bawn and plan to consume 16 megawatts of the electricity generated and sell the rest to the Zimbabwe national grid.

Location
The factory would sit adjacent of PPC's cement factory in Colleen Bawn.

Overview
The power station is designed to have capacity of 32 megawatts. The cement factory is expected to consume 16 megawatts. The remaining  output is expected to be sold directly to the Zimbabwe Electricity Transmission and Distribution Company (ZETDC) for integration into the national grid, under a long-term power purchase agreement.

Developers
The power station is being developed by a Zimbabwean power development investor, with technical partners in South Africa. The consortium of developers is expected to be revealed when all funding arrangements have been completed. The developers were selected out of a field of 38 companies that responded to the tender. The developers of the power station will operate it, on behalf of the owners.

In May 2022, Afrik21.africa reported that the development contract was awarded to CentraWest. The construction contractor is a consortium of Sinohydro of China and African Transmission Corporation Holdings (ATC), "a consultancy firm specializing in infrastructure projects". The cost of construction is budgeted at US$40 million.

Construction
It is expected that once construction starts, it will take eighteen months to complete the power station. Construction began in May 2022 with commercial commissioning anticipated in the fourth quarter of 2023. In May 2022, it was disclosed that a  battery energy storage system (BESS) of 9MW/18MWh will be incorporated in the design.

See also

 List of power stations in Zimbabwe
 Shangani Solar Power Station

References

External links
 South African Cement Producer to Build A Power Plant in Zimbabwe As of 13 July 2020.

Solar power stations in Zimbabwe
Gwanda District
Matabeleland South Province